The T-Type nameplate adopted by Buick to designate typically a more sporty trim level of an existing model line. The approach revived of a similar approach used in the 1960s (and later revived in the 1990s) with the Buick GS designation.

History 
Models carrying a T-Type suffix, were performance-oriented, notably the Buick GNX (based on the Regal platform). At this time, Buick addopted turbochargers for its Regal variant.

The first model to receive the T-Type badge was the 1981 Buick Riviera. Within a few years, other models from the Buick lineup would follow suit. The Grand National (also referred to as "GN"), an adaptation of the Regal T-Type and introduced in 1982, became an instant success; it inspired the company to extend its T-Type line to its other mid-size offering, the Century (though without the turbocharged engine). The compact Skyhawk and Skylark also received the T-Type treatment in 1983, and in 1986 the Somerset did as well.

The T-Type series reached its peak in 1987. By that time, even the full-size LeSabre and Electra were available as T-Type models, but without the turbocharger. The Lesabre T-Type coupe design was a different approach, pieced together from design highlights of the rare 1986 Lesabre Grand National (116 built), and although odd-looking, was a more cohesive touring car package. Also that year, the GNX made automotive history as "the fastest American car in 1987" (a distinction it held through 1989, which was the Regal's second year as a front-wheel drive car). The GNX recorded a 0-60 time of 4.7 seconds, and its "fast car" reputation led many people to dub it "Corvette killer."  In addition, its turbocharged V6 made it an attractive alternative to its similar-bodied V8-powered siblings, such as the Chevrolet Monte Carlo SS and Oldsmobile 442 (neither of which had the turbocharger available to them).

T-Type Models

Legacy 
The T-Type line met its demise in 1990, as an option on the Buick Electra, and the following year, a new, upsized Park Avenue Ultra was introduced with a supercharged engine. The Riviera and Regal also had supercharged engines as an option when they were redesigned in 1995 and 1997, respectively; the current Regal also has a turbocharger as an option, starting with its return to the lineup in 2011, as do the 2012 Buick Verano and 2014 Buick Encore.

The turbocharged engines were usually General Motors' famous 3.8 L V6 engine, but in the case of the Skyhawk, a turbocharged four-cylinder was available (1.8 sourced from Brazil in the Skyhawk, 2.5 in the Skylark/Somerset). Transmission choices were a five-speed manual (Skyhawk only) and, depending on the year and model, a three- or four-speed automatic. The interiors of T-Type cars differed from most other Buicks in that the front seats were almost always bucket seats, and the shifter was mounted in the center console, except the 1981-85 Rivieras which had the buckets and a consolette but a column shifter. Some T-Type Electras and Centurys kept the front bench seats and column shifter intact and even in bucket seat models, the T-Type Electra and Century still had a column-mounted shifter. By comparison, the turbocharged editions of the 2011 Regal and 2012 Verano use a 2.0 L four-cylinder engine that can be mated to either a manual or automatic transmission (both six-speeds), and the Encore uses a 1.4 L four-cylinder engine that is mated to a six-speed automatic only.

The T-Type logo consisted of a large red letter "T", and the word "Type" in small black or white letters. The emblems were only placed on the fenders and on some later models (1986) a grille emblem was used. The single T was only used on the turbo Regals and only in 1987. Originally the T-type name was to be an appearance package and used across the line (which it did) but was confused by the turbo Regal when the 3.8 turbo motor could be ordered with the T-type package. In 1987 Buick dropped the T-Type package on the Regal. All turbo Regals in 1987 came with the Y56 T package and have a T badge on the fenders and on the horn button (a similar T badge also appears on the current Regal Turbo and Verano Turbo). This T package is often erroneously thought to designate the Turbo T package, which is solely the WE4 Regal.

As a drag racer, the GN's main opponent is the Ford Mustang, a prime example of GM's long-standing rivalry with Ford . In 1984, the GN's legend grew when it defeated a Corvette in a quarter-mile run featuring GM vehicles, thus creating a rare instance of "the fastest American car" that was not made by Chevrolet (despite the fact that it had two less cylinders than the normally-aspirated sports car).

Possible Return
It has been rumored that the T-Type, Grand National and GNX nameplates could return to the Buick lineup, to be sold as 4-door sedans. These new incarnations would share a rear-wheel drive platform with the Cadillac ATS and be powered by a choice of two engines that would be mated to an 8-speed automatic transmission or 6-speed manual.  The T-Type and Grand National would use a turbocharged 2.0L 4-cylinder (272 HP) or a naturally aspirated 3.6L V6 (321 HP) while the GNX would most likely get a 3.6L Twin-Turbo V6 (400 HP). This would be the  first use of rear-wheel drive since the Buick Roadmaster was discontinued in 1996.

References

Buick
Regal
Coupés
Front-wheel-drive vehicles
Mid-size cars
Rear-wheel-drive vehicles
Sedans
Station wagons
Cars introduced in 1973
1980s cars
1990s cars
2000s cars
2010s cars
Motor vehicles manufactured in the United States